Ioannis Varvitsiotis (b. 2 August 1933 in Athens) is a Greek politician and a former government minister of Greece. He was a Member of the European Parliament (MEP) for New Democracy from 2004–2009, part of the European People's Party. He was defense minister of Greece from 2 July 1989 till 7 October 1989 and from 11 April 1990 till 13 October 1993. He was member of the Hellenic Parliament from 1974 until 2004.

References

External links
 
 Terms of office after 1974 in the Hellenic Parliament

|-

1933 births
Politicians from Athens
Living people
Justice ministers of Greece
MEPs for Greece 2004–2009
New Democracy (Greece) MEPs
Ministers of National Defence of Greece
Greek MPs 1974–1977
Greek MPs 1977–1981
Greek MPs 1981–1985
Greek MPs 1985–1989
Greek MPs 1989 (June–November)
Greek MPs 1989–1990
Greek MPs 1990–1993
Greek MPs 1993–1996
Greek MPs 1996–2000
Greek MPs 2000–2004